Josh Sharkey (born September 10, 1997) is an American professional basketball player who last played for the Birmingham Squadron of the NBA G League. He played college basketball for Samford.

Early life and high school career
Sharkey grew up in the Olney neighborhood of Philadelphia. As a freshman, he attended Abington Friends School alongside Tony Carr and Lamar Stevens. Sharkey transferred to Archbishop John Carroll High School as a sophomore, where he was teammates with Derrick Jones Jr. and Ryan Daly. He scored 13 points and had 10 rebounds in the 2015 PIAA Class AAA final loss to Saints John Neumann and Maria Goretti Catholic High School. Sharkey was a All-Delco performer at Archbishop Carroll. During the 2015 Peach Jam Invitational, Sharkey averaged 7.1 points per game. He committed to Samford, the only school to offer him a scholarship, over Penn.

College career
Sharkey averaged 8.2 points and 4.2 assists per game as a freshman at Samford but struggled with his shooting, hitting 21.7 percent of his three-point attempts. He started two games, but mainly served as a backup to Christen Cunningham. As a sophomore, Sharkey averaged 7.3 points, 2.1 rebounds, and 5.1 assists per game. On January 24, 2019, he scored 19 points and had a school-record 16 assists in a 107-106 overtime loss to Wofford. He averaged 16.3 points and 7.2 rebounds per game as a junior, earning Second Team All-Southern Conference honors. On January 30, 2020, Sharkey scored a career-high 35 points and had seven assists in a 92-84 loss to Chattanooga. He was named to the midseason watchlist for the Lou Henson Award during his senior season. As a senior, Sharkey averaged 18 points and 7.2 rebounds per game. He was named to the Third Team All-Southern Conference. He finished his Samford career as the leader in assists (758) and steals (285) and was seventh in scoring with 1,592 points.

Professional career
On September 26, 2020, Sharkey signed his first professional contract with Tigers Tübingen of the ProA. On November 3, he was recognized as ProA player of the week after contributing 28 points and 12 assists in a 103-101 win against Paderborn Baskets.

On June 23, 2021, Sharkey signed with Legia Warsaw of the Polish Basketball League. In four games, he averaged 15 points, 2.8 rebounds, 4.5 assists and two steals per game. On October 1, Sharkey signed with Start Lublin.

Delaware Blue Coats (2022)
On January 5, 2022, Sharkey was acquired via available player pool by the Delaware Blue Coats of the NBA G League. He was then later waived on January 18, 2022.

Birmingham Squadron (2022)
On March 30, 2022, Sharkey was acquired via available player pool by the Birmingham Squadron.

Personal life
Jameer Nelson is a cousin of Sharkey's, as Nelson's father and Sharkey's maternal grandfather were brothers. Nelson trains with Sharkey, and he grew up a big fan of the NBA star. Sharkey's favorite musician is Meek Mill.

References

External links
Samford Bulldogs bio

1997 births
Living people
American men's basketball players
American expatriate basketball people in Germany
American expatriate basketball people in Poland
Archbishop John Carroll High School alumni
Basketball players from Philadelphia
Birmingham Squadron players
Delaware Blue Coats players
Legia Warsaw (basketball) players
Point guards
Samford Bulldogs men's basketball players
Start Lublin players
Tigers Tübingen players